This is a list of AM radio stations in the United States having call signs beginning with the letters WG to WM.

WG--

WH--

WI--

WJ--

WK--

WL--

WM--

See also 
 North American call sign

AM radio stations in the United States by call sign (initial letters WG-WM)